Costosyrnola nitidissima is a species of sea snail, a marine gastropod mollusk in the family Pyramidellidae, the pyrams and their allies. The species is one of two known species to exist within the genus, Costosyrnola. The other species being Costosyrnola thailandica.

Distribution
Much like many other mollusks in this family of gastropods, this species occurs mainly throughout the Red Sea.

References

External links
 To World Register of Marine Species

Pyramidellidae
Gastropods described in 1869